The Monterey Historic District in Monterey, Kentucky is a historic district which was listed on the National Register of Historic Places in 1997.

It covers about 14 blocks on the north and south side of U.S. Route 127.  It is roughly bounded by U.S. Route 127, High, Hillcrest, and Taylor Streets.  The  listed area included 124 contributing buildings, one contributing structure and 13 contributing sites.

References

Historic districts on the National Register of Historic Places in Kentucky
Georgian architecture in Kentucky
Late 19th and Early 20th Century American Movements architecture
Buildings and structures completed in 1847
National Register of Historic Places in Owen County, Kentucky